Värmlandstoppen  is a Swedish radio program on Swedish Radio Värmland.

Local artists and groups are involved in the Värmlandstoppen hit list, and must have their own produced material.  Värmlandstoppen often assists musicians in getting record deals. .

Värmlandstoppen premiered in February 1986.  It was cancelled around 1996, then re-launched in January 2005.

References
https://web.archive.org/web/20070930225048/http://www.sr.se/cgi-bin/varmland/program/artikel.asp?ProgramID=2189&Artikel=775302

Sources
https://web.archive.org/web/20070930225048/http://www.sr.se/cgi-bin/varmland/program/artikel.asp?ProgramID=2189&Artikel=775302
 :sv:Värmlandstoppen

External links
 Värmlandstoppen

Swedish radio programs
Music chart shows